Timothy Solin (born June 18, 1958 in Superior, Wisconsin, United States) is an American curler. He competed in the 1998 Winter Olympics and at three World Senior Curling Championships.

Curling career 
He played at the 1998 Winter Olympics as alternate for Tim Somerville's team, where USA men's team finished in fourth place. In 2007 he played second for Mike Farbelow when they won the Minnesota State Championship and then won the United States Men's Club Championship.

Solin has won the United States Senior Men's Championship three times, in 2011 and 2016 with Geoff Goodland as skip and 2017 with Mike Farbelow as skip. Winning Senior Nationals earns the team the chance to represent the United States at the World Senior Curling Championships; Solin's first trip to World Seniors in 2011 has been his most successful, earning the silver medal when they lost to Canada's Mark Johnson in the final. At the 2016 World Seniors Team Goodland again made it to the playoffs, but lost to Denmark in the quarterfinals. In 2017 Solin's team failed to make the playoffs, finishing the round-robin with a 3–4 record.

Awards
 2011 United States Curling Association Team of the Year (with teammates Geoff Goodland, Pete Westberg, Ken Olson, and Philip DeVore)

Teams

References

External links

Nagano 1998 – Official Report Vol. 3 (web archive; "Curling" chapter begins at page 236)

Living people
1958 births
People from Superior, Wisconsin
American male curlers

Curlers at the 1998 Winter Olympics
Olympic curlers of the United States
American curling coaches